Jacinto João, also known as J. J. (January 25, 1944, Luanda – October 29, 2004, Setúbal) was one of the greatest Portuguese football players of his time. He played as a left winger.

Portugal had so many great attacking players at that time that Jacinto João won just 10 caps for the Portugal national team, scoring two goals. His debut was on 27 October 1968, in a 3–0 win over Romania in a World Cup qualifying match, when he came on as substitute for António Simões, and scored a goal. He was not included in the team that played at the Independence Brazil Cup, in 1972. His last game for Portugal national team, was on 3 April 1974, in a 0–0 draw with England in Lisbon, in a friendly match.

He played for 14 seasons for Vitória de Setúbal, scoring 66 goals in 268 games, helping them to 2nd place in the Portuguese league in 1971/72. He was one of the few great Portuguese football players of his generation who never played for Benfica, Sporting Lisbon or Porto. After retiring from activity he remained working for his club's Technical Staff until he died in 2004, of a fourth and fatal heart attack. Vitória de Setúbal erected a statue in his honour.

Jacinto João shared a birthday with his contemporary football legend Eusébio, January 25.

|}

1944 births
2004 deaths
Angolan footballers
Portuguese footballers
Portuguese sportspeople of Angolan descent
Vitória F.C. players
Portugal international footballers

Association football midfielders
Footballers from Luanda